Loon Lake is a  lake located in Stevens County, Washington,  north-northwest of Spokane, Washington at an elevation of .

Loon Lake was named for the wild loons near the water.

Details
Loon Lake is a popular destination for water-based recreation including swimming, fishing, boating, kayaking, sailing, water skiing and jet-skiing.  Its shores are lined with numerous cabins.  The cabins are used primarily as weekend retreats and vacation cottages, but some are occupied year-round.

An unofficial boat parade occurs every 4th of July, wherein lake residents and visitors decorate their boats and move in procession around the edge of the lake.

The town of Loon Lake, Washington lies immediately to the north of the lake.

See also
 List of lakes in Washington

References

External links
 Loon Lake Historical Society
 The Loon Lake, Washington Digital Image Project

Lakes of Washington (state)
Lakes of Stevens County, Washington